Feng Prefecture may refer to:

Feng Prefecture (modern Shaanxi), a prefecture between the 6th and 14th centuries in modern Shaanxi and Gansu, China
Feng Prefecture (modern Guangdong), a prefecture between the 6th and 14th centuries in modern Guangdong and Guangxi, China
Fengzhou Prefecture (Liao dynasty) 豐州, the name of a Liao dynasty prefecture just east of the modern city of Hohhot in Inner Mongolia

See also
Feng (disambiguation)